Nathan Anderson is the founder of Hindenburg Research, a New York-based investment management firm, and a forensic financial investigator that is famous for releasing reports on alleged wrongdoing by companies. When publishing some of these reports, his company profits by short selling the target company's stocks (that is, by making a bet in securities markets that the price of the company's shares will decline). If all goes according to plan, the report itself will cause the price of the stock to decline, leaving Hindenburg Research with a profit from its short position.

Childhood and early career 
Anderson's exact birth date is not publicly known, but he was thought to be 38 years old in early 2023. Anderson grew up in the state of Connecticut. He is the son of a university professor and a nurse. During a business podcast, Anderson recalled that he had tried to convince a rabbi that the Book of Genesis was incompatible with the modern theory of evolution.

He earned a degree in international business from the University of Connecticut. Between March 2004 and January 2005, he worked as an ambulance driver in Israel and attended classes at Hebrew University.

He has qualified for two financial professional certifications: the Chartered Alternative Investment Analyst (CAIA) and the Certified Financial Analyst (CFA).

He began his financial career working for FactSet Research Systems Inc. He later described his experiences to the Wall Street Journal by saying: "I realized they were doing a lot of run-of-the-mill analysis, there was a lot of conformity." He then took a job vetting potential investments for the private wealth management services of wealthy people. After this initial experience, he founded his first firm, ClaritySpring.

Later career – forensic reports and short selling 
Anderson has stated that his decision to specialise in financial fraud investigations was inspired by Harry Markopolos, a financial fraud investigator who was instrumental in uncovering the Bernie Madoff's investment scandal. Anderson reportedly worked with Markopolos on the Platinum Partners investigation, which resulted in 7 executives being charged with securities fraud. Around 2014, Anderson began filing whistleblowing reports with U.S. authorities, hoping to collect government bounties for uncovering fraud (for an example of such a program, see the Security and Exchange Commission's Office of the Whistleblower).

Anderson founded Hindenburg Research, a small investment management specialising in forensic finance investigations, in 2018. It seeks to unearth 'man-made disasters floating around in the market'. In 2023, the firm was thought to employ about a dozen people. Its website describes its activities as follows:... we believe the most impactful research results from uncovering hard-to-find information from atypical sources. In particular we often look for situations where companies may have any combination of:

 Accounting irregularities 
 Bad actors in management or key service provider roles 
 Undisclosed related-party transactions 
 Illegal/unethical business or financial reporting practices
 Undisclosed regulatory, product, or financial issuesThe firm's first influential report – in September 2020 – targeted electric vehicle manufacturer, Nikola Corporation. The report alleged that Nikola was lying about its technology and the performance of its products. The U.S. Securities and Exchange Commission and the U.S. Department of Justice investigated these claims and Trevor Milton, the founder of Nikola, was ultimately convicted of fraud charges. In January 2023, a high-profile Hindenburg report covered alleged massive stock manipulation and accounting fraud by the Adani Group, an Indian conglomerate headed by, Gautam Adani, one of the richest men in the world.

Anderson is not forthcoming about his wealth or personal status (he refuses interviews, for example). Furthermore, Hindenburg Research is not publicly traded, so few rules for information disclosure apply to its top officers. It is thought, however, that, via his ownership stake in Hindenburg Research, he is at least a multi-millionaire.

References

Living people
American money managers
American financial analysts
Year of birth missing (living people)